A chromophil biological cell is a cell which is easily stainable by absorbing chromium salts used in histology to increase the visual contrast of samples for microscopy.

Function
Chromophil cells are mostly hormone-producing cells containing so-called chromaffin granules. In these subcellular structures, amino acid precursors to certain hormones are accumulated and subsequently decarboxylated to the corresponding amines, for example epinephrine, norepinephrine, dopamine or serotonin. Chromophil cells therefore belong to the group of APUD (amine precursor uptake and decarboxylation) cells.

Location
These cells are scattered throughout the whole body, but particularly in glands such as the hypothalamus, hypophysis, thyroid, parathyroid and pancreas.

See also 
 Chromophobe cell
 Melanotroph
 Acidophil cell
 Basophil cell
 Oxyphil cell
 Oxyphil cell (parathyroid)
 Pituitary gland
 Neuroendocrine cell

Cells